FC Rànger's is an Andorran football club based in Andorra la Vella. The team currently plays in Segona Divisió.

History 
The club was founded in 1981, but they only started playing in Andorran leagues in 1999. FC Rànger's aren't associated with Glasgow Rangers.  After two years in the Andorran Second Division, they played for the first time in the Campionat de Lliga in the 2001–02 season. After the promotion, FC Rànger's started a growing career, and after finishing second in 2005, they won the league title the two subsequent years, 2006 and 2007.

FC Rànger's made their first time appearance in European competitions, playing the UEFA Intertoto Cup in the summer of 2005, being eliminated by Sturm Graz by 6–1 in aggregate. The home match ended with a 1–1 draw, scored by Norberto Urbani. After winning the Andorran championship, they qualified for the UEFA Cup, where they were eliminated in the first round by FK Sarajevo. FC Rànger's became the first Andorran team to compete in the UEFA Champions League by qualifying for the 2007–08 season. However, their stay was short-lived as they were eliminated in the first qualifying round after a 5–0 aggregate loss to Sheriff Tiraspol over two rounds played on 17 July and 25 July 2007.

At the end of the 2008–09 season the team was relegated. After two seasons in Segona Divisió the team finished second in the 2010–11 season and was promoted (promotion-ineligible Lusitanos B finished champion). In the 2011–12 season FC Ranger's finished 8th in Primera Divisió being relegated again to Segona Divisió where it has remained since then.

Sponsorship:
Pizzeria Venècia (2004–2006)
Construccions Buiques (2006-2009)
Assega Insurance (2022-Present)

Honours 
Primera Divisió:
Winners (2): 2005–06, 2006–07
Runners-up (1): 2004–05
Copa Constitució:
Runners-up (1): 2006
Supercopa Andorrana:
Winners (1): 2006
Runners-up (1): 2007
Segona Divisió:
Winners (1): 2000–01
Runners-up (1): 2010–11

Current squad 
As of 10 February 2015.

(vice-captain)

(captain)

Notable players

European records 
As of December, 2008.

External links
FC Rànger's at UEFA.COM
FC Rànger's at Weltfussball.de
FC Rànger's at National Football Teams.com
FC Rànger's at Football-Lineups.com

 
1981 establishments in Andorra
Association football clubs established in 1981
Football clubs in Andorra
Sport in Andorra la Vella

el:Ρέιντζερς ΦΚ